General Francis Dundas (c. 1759 – 15 January 1824) was a British general and acting governor of the Cape Colony between 1798 and 1803.

Francis Dundas was the second son of Robert Dundas of Arniston and Jean Grant, and the nephew of Henry Dundas, 1st Viscount Melville and War Secretary.

Military service
He was commissioned into the 1st Foot Guards in 1775. He transferred to the 45th Foot in 1783 and the 1st Foot in 1787.  He served in the American Revolutionary War under Cornwallis, at the Battle of Clapp's Mills,
the Battle of Green Spring, and the Siege of Yorktown.

In 1796, he commanded the Scots brigade (later 94th Foot) encamped at West Barns.
He was succeeded by General Hill.

He was ordered to the Cape in August 1796 after the first British occupation to become major-general and commander of the forces in May 1797. He first acted as governor from 21 November 1798 to 9 December 1799 and again from 20 April 1801 to 20 February 1803, when the Colony was returned to the Batavian Republic in accordance with the Treaty of Amiens signed on 27 March 1802. During his governorship the Graaff Reinet Revolt of 1798 and the Third Frontier War took place. His administration was seen to be autocratic but fair.

After the Cape he held several important military appointments in Britain. He commanded the Kent division of the army collected on the south coast of England under Sir David Dundas during part of the invasion alarms of 1804-5. (Foster's Peerage under Melville)

He was promoted full general on 1 January 1812 and made Colonel of the 71st (Glasgow Highland Light Infantry) Regiment of Foot from 1809 until his death in 1824.

Family
Francis Dundas was married to Eliza Cumming, daughter of Sir John Cumming, Bt. on 22 January 1800 in the Chaplaincy to the British Forces in Cape Town and had the following children 
Francis Dundas born 16 January 1801 in Cape Town
Robert Dundas born 3 November 1805 in Berwick on Tweed
Caroline Dundas born 21 January 1807 at St. John, Newcastle
Wedderburn Dundas
Henrietta Dundas
Alexander Dundas

References

External links
Forts of Frontier Country

|-

1759 births
1824 deaths
People from Berwick-upon-Tweed
People from the Scottish Borders
British Army generals
Grenadier Guards officers
Sherwood Foresters officers
Royal Scots officers
Governors of the Cape Colony
British Army personnel of the French Revolutionary Wars